Martin James Buchan (born 3 April 1977) is a former professional footballer who played as a midfielder for Aberdeen, Dundee United, Partick Thistle, Montrose, Peterhead and Cove Rangers. Born in England, he represented the Scotland U21 national team. He is the son of former Manchester United and Scotland player Martin Buchan.

Early life
Buchan was the fourth member of his family to play senior football, following his grandfather Martin (Aberdeen and Dundee United), his father Martin (Aberdeen, Manchester United and Scotland) and his uncle George (Aberdeen and Manchester United). He was born in Manchester during his father's playing career there.

Club career
Buchan started his career with Aberdeen, from whom he spent a short spell on loan at Stonehaven prior to making his first team debut. He spent five years with Aberdeen before joining Dundee United on a free transfer in 2000. After two seasons, Buchan moved to Partick Thistle in 2002. A period out of football followed due to red tape before his move to Peterhead in 2004. He left Peterhead for Montrose in January 2008. Buchan joined Highland League club Cove Rangers in 2009.

International career
Although born in England, Buchan was qualified to represent Scotland by being of Scottish parentage. He made thirteen appearances for the Scotland under-21 national team between 1997 and 1999.

References

External links
 
 

1977 births
Aberdeen F.C. players
Dundee United F.C. players
Livingston F.C. players
Raith Rovers F.C. players
Partick Thistle F.C. players
Montrose F.C. players
Living people
English footballers
Footballers from Manchester
Anglo-Scots
Scottish Premier League players
Scottish Football League players
Scotland under-21 international footballers
Cove Rangers F.C. players
Peterhead F.C. players
Highland Football League players
Association football midfielders
Scottish footballers